In graph theory, the bipartite half or half-square of a bipartite graph  is a graph whose vertex set is one of the two sides of the bipartition (without loss of generality) and in which there is an edge  for each pair of vertices  in  that are at distance two from each other in . That is, in a more compact notation, the bipartite half is  where the superscript 2 denotes the square of a graph and the square brackets denote an induced subgraph.

Examples
For instance, the bipartite half of the complete bipartite graph  is the complete graph  and the bipartite half of the hypercube graph is the halved cube graph.
When  is a distance-regular graph, its two bipartite halves are both distance-regular. For instance, the halved Foster graph is one of finitely many degree-6 distance-regular locally linear graphs.

Representation and hardness
Every graph  is the bipartite half of another graph, formed by subdividing the edges of  into two-edge paths. Every representation arises in this way.

Special cases
The map graphs, that is, the intersection graphs of interior-disjoint simply-connected regions in the plane, are exactly the bipartite halves of bipartite planar graphs.

See also
Bipartite double cover

References

Graph operations
Bipartite graphs